"I Seek/Daylight" is the 49th single by Japanese boy band Arashi. It was released on May 18, 2016 under their record label J Storm. "I seek" was used as the theme song for the drama Sekai Ichi Muzukashii Koi starring Arashi member Satoshi Ohno, and "Daylight" was used as the theme song for the drama 99.9 Keiji Senmon Bengoshi starring Arashi member Jun Matsumoto. The single sold over 737,000 copies in its first week and topped the weekly Oricon Singles Chart. "I seek/Daylight" was certified for Triple Platinum by the Recording Industry Association of Japan (RIAJ).

Single information
"I seek/Daylight" was released in three editions: a regular edition and two limited editions. The regular edition contains the B-sides "Tadaima" and "supersonic", instrumentals for all four tracks, and a 10-page lyrics booklet. The limited editions contain a DVD with a music video and making-of for one of the A-side tracks, and a 16-page lyrics booklet. The album jacket covers for the three versions are different.

"I seek" was used as the theme song for the drama Sekai Ichi Muzukashii Koi starring Arashi member Satoshi Ohno, and "Daylight" was used as the theme song for the drama 99.9 Keiji Senmon Bengoshi starring Arashi member Jun Matsumoto. Daylight is Arashi's first A-side song to feature rapping by Sho Sakurai since "Face Down" in 2012. "Tadaima" was created specially to be used as the theme song for ARASHI “Japonism Show” in ARENA, Arashi's first arena tour in nine years.

Track listing

Chart performance
The single debuted at number one on the Oricon daily singles chart, selling 406,274 copies upon its release and selling 737,951 copies by the end of the week, topping the Oricon and Billboard Japan weekly singles charts. The single sold 48,420 copies in its second week and stayed in the top ten for three consecutive weeks.

Charts and certifications

Charts

Sales and certifications

Release history

References

External links
I seek/Daylight product information
Hard Copy Sales Certifications 2016 (RIAJ)

2016 songs
Arashi songs